Albert Morris Chandler (born November 18, 1950) is a former professional American football player who played tight end for six seasons for the Cincinnati Bengals, New England Patriots, and St. Louis Cardinals.

References

1950 births
American football tight ends
American football wide receivers
Cincinnati Bengals players
New England Patriots players
St. Louis Cardinals (football) players
Oklahoma Sooners football players
Living people
Sportspeople from Oklahoma City